Real Estate Weekly is a weekly American real estate magazine primarily covering New York City.

References

External links
Official site

Real estate in the United States
Business magazines published in the United States